Brian Schmidt (born 1967) is an American-Australian astrophysicist.

Brian Schmidt may also refer to:

 Brian L. Schmidt (born 1962), American music composer
 Bryan Schmidt (born 1981), American ice hockey player
 Bryan Schmidt (footballer) (born 1995), Argentine footballer
 Bryan Thomas Schmidt (born 1969), American science fiction author and editor

See also
Brian Smith (disambiguation)
Bryan Smith (disambiguation)
Brian Smyth (disambiguation)